Rajiv Gupta is the Chairman of the Chhattisgarh Human Rights Commission and was the Chief Justice of the Chhattisgarh High Court, Uttarakhand High Court and Kerala High Court.

Early life and education
Rajiv Gupta was born at Gwalior in Madhya Pradesh on 10 October 1950. He completed his LL.B. from Jiwaji University, Gwalior.

Career
Rajiv Gupta started practice in Madhya Pradesh High Court in November 1973 and continued to practise there till 1994. He was appointed Judge of the Madhya Pradesh High Court in September 1994. He assumed charge as Chief Justice of Kerala High Court on 27 April 2005. He was then transferred to High Court of Uttarakhand at Nainital and he assumed charge on 14 January 2006. Later on he was transferred to Chhattisgarh High Court on 2 February 2008. He replaced Justice Jagdish Bhalla, who has been transferred to Himachal Pradesh High Court. In October 2012, he was appointed the Chairman of the Chhattisgarh Human Rights Commission.

References 

Living people
Chief Justices of Chhattisgarh High Court
20th-century Indian judges
Justices of the Uttarakhand High Court
Chief Justices of the Kerala High Court
Judges of the Madhya Pradesh High Court
20th-century Indian lawyers
People from Gwalior
1950 births